is a mountain on the border of Shisō, Hyōgo Prefecture, and Wakasa, Tottori Prefecture, Japan.

Outline 
Mount Mimuro is one of the fault-block of mountains typical in Chūgoku Mountains. This mountain belongs to the Hyōnosen-Ushiroyama-Nagisan Quasi-National Park. This mountain is one of Hyōgo 50 mountains, and also one of Kinki 100 mountains, Chūgoku 100 mountains.

Access 
 Kawachi Bus Stop of Shinki Bus

Gallery

References
 Ministry of Environment of Japan
 Official Home Page of the Geographical Survey Institute in Japan
 ‘Shinban Furusato Hyōgo 50 San’, Hyōgo-ken Sangaku Renmei

Mimuroyama
Mimuroyama